1907 was the 18th season of County Championship cricket in England. Nottinghamshire won their first official title. England played their sixth Test series against South Africa but it was the first to be held in England.

South African tour

This was the fourth South African tour of England following those in 1894, 1901 and 1904. The 1907 tour was the first to feature Test matches between England and South Africa in England, although the teams had played Tests in South Africa since 1888–89. England won the series 1–0 with two matches drawn.

Series summary
 First Test at Lord's – match drawn	
 Second Test at Headingley – England won by 53 runs
 Third Test at The Oval – match drawn

County Championship

Points system:
 1 for a win
 0 for a draw, a tie or an abandoned match
 -1 for a loss

Minor Counties Championship
An entirely new system of scoring was adopted for the Minor Counties Championship in 1907. With Oxfordshire dropping out and Lincolnshire and Worcestershire Second Eleven coming in, the twenty-one Minor Counties clubs were split into four divisions – North, Midlands, East and West – and a system of semi-finals between division leaders and a final was used to determine the winner.

North

One match between Lancashire Second Eleven and Staffordshire was abandoned without a ball bowled due to rain.

Midlands

East

West

Points system:
 5 for an outright win
 3 for a win on the first innings
 0 for a loss either outright or on the first innings of a drawn match
Matches with no first innings result are ignored when calculating maximum possible points.

Semi-finals
 22 August – Lancashire Second Eleven 263 defeated Hertfordshire 85 and 101 by an innings and 77 runs
 29 August – Surrey Second Eleven 198 and 103 lost to Glamorgan 146 and 156 for six wickets by four wickets

Final
 Lancashire Second Eleven 243 and 121 defeated Glamorgan 74 and 182 by 108 runs.

Wisden Cricketers of the Year
 Albert Hallam, Reginald Schwarz, Frank Tarrant, Bert Vogler, Thomas Wass

Leading batsmen (qualification 20 innings)

Leading bowlers (qualification 1,000 balls)

Notable events
 1 June – Colin Blythe takes 17 wickets for 48 runs in one day's cricket against Northamptonshire, setting two records:
 The best bowling analysis in a first-class match, beaten only by Jim Laker when he took nineteen wickets for 90 runs for England against Australia in 1956.
 The first bowler to take seventeen wickets in a single day – a feat since equalled only by Hedley Verity in 1933 and Tom Goddard in 1939.
 Playing against Gloucestershire at the Spa Ground in June, Northamptonshire were dismissed in their first innings for only 12 runs, which is still the lowest innings total in the history of the County Championship.
 As many as ten pairs of bowlers bowled unchanged throughout two completed innings during a match, the most on record in English cricket history.

Notes
The match between Middlesex and Lancashire at Lord's was abandoned when it was found the pitch was trampled by impatient spectators.

References

Bibliography
 H S Altham, A History of Cricket, Volume 1 (to 1914), George Allen & Unwin, 1962
 Bill Frindall, The Wisden Book of Test Cricket 1877-1978, Wisden, 1979
 Sydney H. Pardon (editor), John Wisden’s Cricketers’ Almanack, Forty-Fifth Edition, Wisden, 1908
 Roy Webber, The Playfair Book of Cricket Records, Playfair Books, 1951

External links
 CricketArchive – England in 1907

1907 in English cricket
English cricket seasons in the 20th century